The IPT-0 Bichinho was a Brazilian single-seat, single engined experimental sports aircraft.

Design and development
When Frederico Brotero took over the Seção de Aeronáutica(in English: Aeronautics Section) of IPT(Instituto de Pesquisas Tecnológicas), encouraged the creation of several aeronautics projects, and gave continuity to others that were stopped, one of them was the IPT-0 Bichino that was redrawn. The name Bichinho(in English: Little Warm) came from the idea of making the smallest plane possible.

Brotero employed various construction techniques on this aircraft, it was built using freijó and pinho, with pointed wings, with hypersupportive aerodynamic edges on the leading edge. This type of wing eventually became a signature feature in all subsequent IPT aircraft. It was a monoplace, wooden airplane, externally covered with plywood and canvas, conventional fixed landing gear.

Tests with the first prototype showed structural flaws, which had been solved in the other variants, a transparent canopy was also added.

Variants
IPT-0A BichinhoIt was similar to its predecessor, but with an open cockpit and a modified nose to receive the Continental 4-cylinder 65 HP engine, and a fixed-pitch, domestically-manufactured two-bladed propeller. The landing gear was not fairing. It flew for two years until disassembled for structural tests. A prototype built.
IPT-0B BichinhoIt began construction in 1943, had a Continental 4-cylinder 75 HP engine. It was heavier than its predecessors, however it had superior performance. To improve cooling the fairing left the cylinders exposed. It was used for three years by IPT, until it was donated to an airclub in the region of Rio Claro, where it remained in use until 1988, when it was given to the Museu Aeroespacial. Only one built.
IPT-0C BichinhoThe fourth and last prototype built, clustered similarly to the others. It started to be built in 1943 and was completed in 1944. It had a Continental 4-cylinder 85 HP engine. It had a transparent canopy which slid backwards. After testing it was disassembled.

Specifications (IPT-0 Bichinho)

References

External links

Photo of the IPT-0B Bichinho

Single-engined tractor aircraft
Low-wing aircraft
1940s Brazilian civil aircraft
1940s Brazilian sport aircraft
Aircraft first flown in 1940